Social Evolution is the title of an essay by Benjamin Kidd, which became available as a book published by Macmillan and co London in 1894. In it, Kidd discusses the basis for society as an evolving phenomenon, with reference to past societies, the important developments of his own period of thriving capitalist industry, and possible future developments.

The book is important in that it summarises the thinking of Herbert Spencer as well as others like Karl Marx at the end of the nineteenth century when many people were trying to make sense of Darwin's evolutionary ideas, and social Darwinism was a hot topic. Kidd finds flaws in the ideas of both Spencer and Marx. With no knowledge of World War I that was to come in 1914, or the Bolshevik revolution of 1917, Kidd explained the flaw in Marx's thinking, and predicted that capitalist industries would not ultimately fall into the hands of the workers as Marx was claiming was inevitable, and that any communist society must ultimately fail.

Herbert Spencer, whose writings were very influential in the latter half of the nineteenth century, thought that man's nature was evolving towards a state of perfection such that he would naturally live in harmony with society, but Kidd explained how this was incompatible with the neo-Darwinian theory that was being accepted as a result of August Weismann's doctrine of germ-line transmission without modification.

Kidd's major claim is that religion makes sense when seen as what he calls a 'supra-rational sanction' for our behaviour, which acts in the interest of survival of the group, and the yet-to-be-born members of the group, and is necessarily in conflict with our basic human instincts which act in favour of the individual in his lifetime. Thus, while not believing in any supernatural being, Kidd proposed that religion, a feature of so many past and present societies, was probably essential to the evolutionary survival of a society.

Chapters 

1  The Outlook

 "To the thoughtful mind the outlook at the close of the nineteenth century is profoundly interesting.  .. a definite stage in the evolution of society is drawing to a close ... Yet one of the most curious features of the time is the almost complete absence of any clear indication from those who speak in the name of science and authority as to the direction in which the path of future progress lies".

2  Conditions of Human Progress

 "It is now coming to be recognised as a necessarily inherent part of the doctrine of evolution, that if the continual selection which is always going on amongst the higher forms of life were to be suspended, these forms would not only possess no tendency to make progress forwards, but must actually go backwards".

3  There is no Rational Sanction for the Conditions of Progress

"As man can only reach his highest development and employ his powers to the full extent in society, it follows that in the evolution we witness him undergoing throughout history, his development as an individual is necessarily of less importance than his development as a social creature."
"Do any of us deny ourselves a single scuttle of coals so as to make our coalfields last for one more generation?"

4  The Central Feature of Human History

"If we could conceive a visitor from another planet coming amongst us ... He would see that he was in reality living in the midst of a civilisation where the habits, customs, laws, and institutions of the people had been influenced in almost every detail by these religions."

5  The Function of Religious Beliefs in the Evolution of Society

6  Western Civilisation

7  Western Civilisation (contd)

8  Modern Socialism

9  Human Evolution is not Primarily Intellectual

10 Concluding Remarks

See also 

 Social evolution (disambiguation)
 Auguste Comte
 Evolutionary psychology
 Sociocultural evolution
 Origin of religion
 Psychology of religion

External links 
 Social Evolution on Google Books
 Cultural Evolution by Agner Fog
 New York Times review of Kidd's later work
 Social Evolutionism at University of Alabama

1894 non-fiction books